Craig Lynes (born 7 February 1981) is a Scottish former footballer who played for East Stirlingshire, Dumbarton and East Fife.

References

1981 births
Scottish footballers
Dumbarton F.C. players
East Fife F.C. players
East Stirlingshire F.C. players
Scottish Football League players
Living people
Footballers from Edinburgh
Association football midfielders